The 2019 Calcutta Football League Premier Division was the 122nd season of the top state-level football league within the Indian state of West Bengal. It started from 26 July 2019. It had two sub-divisions: CFL Premier Division A and CFL Premier Division B.

Peerless scripted history as they become the only club outside the Big Three—Mohun Bagan, East Bengal, & Mohammedan—to win the Championship in 61 years. Eastern Railway did the same back in 1958.

Premier Division A

Managers and foreign players

Venues

 Kolkata

 Vivekananda Yuba Bharati Krirangan
 Mohun Bagan Ground
 East Bengal Ground
 Mohammedan Ground
 Rabindra Sarobar Stadium

 Kalyani

 Kalyani Stadium
 Gayeshpur Stadium

 Barasat

 Vidyasagar Krirangan

Standings

Results

Top goal scorers

Premier Division B

Standings

Matches into Championship & Relegation Round.

References

2019–20 in Indian football leagues
Calcutta Premier Division